Ada is a village in the municipalities of Odžak (Federation of Bosnia and Herzegovina) and Vukosavlje (Republika Srpska), Bosnia and Herzegovina.

Demographics 
According to the 2013 census, its population was 315, with 186 living in the Odžak part and 129 in the Vukosavlje part.

References

Populated places in Odžak
Populated places in Vukosavlje